The Lethbridge Longhorns were a junior "A" ice hockey team in the Alberta Junior Hockey League (AJHL) based in Lethbridge, Alberta, Canada.

History 
The Lethbridge Longhorns were originally the Lethbridge Sugar Kings, one of the five original member hockey teams of the AJHL. The Sugar Kings folded following the 1972–73 season due to the forthcoming arrival of major junior hockey to Lethbridge. A new ownership group saved the team and renamed it the Longhorns in time for the 1973–74 season. The team only lasted two seasons however, folding after the 1974–75 season due to competition with major junior hockey. The Lethbridge Broncos of the Western Hockey League arrived from Swift Current in 1974.

Season-by-season record 

Note: GP = games played, W = wins, L = losses, OTL = overtime losses, Pts = points, GF = goals for, GA = goals against, PIM = penalties in minutes

See also 
 List of ice hockey teams in Alberta

References

External links 
Alberta Junior Hockey League

Defunct Alberta Junior Hockey League teams
Defunct ice hockey teams in Alberta
Defunct junior ice hockey teams in Canada
Ice hockey clubs established in 1973
Sport in Lethbridge
1973 establishments in Alberta
1975 disestablishments in Alberta
Ice hockey clubs disestablished in 1975